Homalosciadium is a genus of flowering plants belonging to the family Apiaceae.

Its native range is Southwestern Australia.

Species:
 Homalosciadium homalocarpum (F.Muell.) H.Eichler

References

Apiaceae
Apiaceae genera